Maxim Rusnac (born 29 September 1992 in Bălți) is a Moldovan cyclist, who last rode for UCI Continental team .

Major results
Source: 

2011
 7th Road race, National Road Championships
2012
 National Road Championships
4th Time trial
5th Road race
2013
 2nd Time trial, National Under-23 Road Championships
 9th Trofeo Città di San Vendemiano
2014
 National Road Championships
6th Road race
7th Time trial
2015
 National Road Championships
1st  Road race
1st  Time trial
2016
 National Road Championships
1st  Time trial
2nd Road race
 5th Trofeo Edil C
2017
 National Road Championships
2nd Time trial
2nd Road race
 5th Overall Tour of Szeklerland
1st Mountains classification
 10th Overall Sibiu Cycling Tour
2018
 National Road Championships
1st  Road race
3rd Time trial

References

External links

1992 births
Living people
Moldovan male cyclists